Quapa is a former Tongva village located in Encino or the San Fernando Valley in Los Angeles County, California. It was one of several villages located within the San Fernando Valley area, including Kowanga, Mapipinga, Okowvinja, Pascegna, Saway-yanga, Tacuenga, and Tuyunga.

The general location of the village was recorded by Padre Santa Maria in 1796.

Villagers from Quapa as well as surrounding villages were baptized at Mission San Fernando, which was established in 1797, and exploited for their labor at the mission, where they worked the grounds and upkeep of the mission.

In 1833, after the mission was secularized, it was recorded that 2,784 native people were baptized, 1,367 of whom were children, from 1797-1833. At the end of this period, around 400 native people survived to the end of the mission period. Many of the native people moved to surrounding communities in the area.

See also
Toviscanga
Yaanga
:Category: Tongva populated places
Tongva language
California mission clash of cultures

References

Former settlements in Los Angeles County, California
Former Native American populated places in California
Former populated places in California
Tongva populated places